Radomierz may refer to the following places in Poland:
Radomierz, Lower Silesian Voivodeship (south-west Poland)
Radomierz, Greater Poland Voivodeship (west-central Poland)